Charles Arthur Barnard (March 22, 1880 – December 6, 1977) was an American college football player and coach. He served as the head coach for one season each at the University of Georgia (1904) and the George Washington University (1905). Barnard attended Harvard University, where he played football as a guard. In 1901, he was named a consensus All-American. Barnard graduated from Harvard in 1902. In 1904, he became the tenth head coach of the Georgia football team and recorded a 1–5 record. The following year, Barnard took over the head coaching job at George Washington, which he held for one year. There, he recorded a 3–4–2 record.

Head coaching record

References

External links
 Arlington National Cemetery

1880 births
1977 deaths
American football guards
George Washington Colonials football coaches
Georgia Bulldogs football coaches
Harvard Crimson football players
All-American college football players
Coaches of American football from Washington, D.C.
Players of American football from Washington, D.C.